
Chodzież County is a unit of territorial administration and local government (powiat) in Greater Poland Voivodeship, west-central Poland. It came into being on January 1, 1999, as a result of the Polish local government reforms passed in 1998.

As of 2006 its total population is 46,967, out of which the population of Chodzież is 19,652, that of Szamocin is 4,267, that of Margonin is 2,956, and the rural population is 20,092.

Neighbouring counties
Chodzież County is bordered by Piła County to the north, Wągrowiec County to the south-east, Oborniki County to the south and Czarnków-Trzcianka County to the west.

Administrative division
The county is subdivided into five gminas (one urban, two urban-rural and two rural). These are listed in the following table, in descending order of population.

References
Polish official population figures 2006

 
Land counties of Greater Poland Voivodeship